The Battle of Urumia was a battle between the Parthians and the Romans. It took place in 36 BC.
 Parthian superiority in cavalry on the flat plains of western Iran was to great an advantage to overcome for their Roman opponents.
The battle was a decisive Parthian victory.

References

Urumia
Urumia
Urumia
1st century BC in Iran
1st century BC in the Roman Republic